The Chicago Challenge of Champions tennis exhibition tournament was held on January 4–9, 1983 at the Rosemont Horizon in Rosemont, Illinois.  The promoter was Andrzej Kepinski, and this was the first year of sponsorship by Miller Lite.  This was the third year of the Challenge.

Ivan Lendl won in the final 4–6, 6–4, 7–5, 6–4 against Jimmy Connors.

Dates, schedule and attendance
Match play began at 6:30 p.m. each evening from Tuesday, January 4, 1982 through Friday, January 7, 1982.  The semi-finals were held at 7:30 p.m. on Saturday, January 8, 1982, and the finals were held at 2:30 p.m. on Sunday, January 9, 1982.

The attendance for Friday's matches was approximately 15,000.  Attendance at Saturday's semi-finals was 15,820, and according to the promoter this was a sell-out of the stadium when configured for tennis.  Attendance at Sunday's finals was 11,416

Purse
The total purse was $250,000.  The winner received $100,00, the runner-up $50,000, third and fourth-place finishers received $30,000 each, fifth and sixth-place finishers received $12,500, and the seventh and eighth-place finishers received $7,500.  Individual players also received undisclosed amounts for appearing at the event from the sponsors/promoters.

Players

Draw

Finals

Group A

Group B

References

Tennis tournaments in the United States
Exhibition tennis tournaments
1983 in American tennis
Tennis tournaments in Illinois
1983 in sports in Illinois